Two is Kathryn Williams 7th studio album, released by CAW Records on 3 March 2008.

The album is a collaboration with Neill MacColl. The pair met at the Daughters of Albion concert at the Barbican in 2005 where she performed "The First Time Ever I Saw Your Face", which was written by Neill MacColl's father, Ewan MacColl. They met up in May 2007 to write and record 21 songs for the album in six days.

Critical reception

The album garnered positive reviews with The Independent calling the album "a magical meeting of intuitive musical minds". The BBC's Michael Quinn claimed it is "a disc to be cherished from the first note to the last". Drowned in Sound said "There is such an ease to each composition, as if they have been played for years". The Guardian decided "it would be a major triumph if there was just a little variety in the mood & pace".

Track listing 
 6am Corner—3:22
 Innocent When You Dream—3:15 (Tom Waits)
 Come With Me—3:27
 Before It Goes—3:06
 Blue Fields—3:15
 Frame—3:20
 Grey Goes—3:01
 Weather Forever—3:40
 Shoulders—3:46
 Armchair—2:42
 Rolling Down—2:31
 All—1:07
 Holes In Your Life—3:02

Personnel 
 Kathryn Williams – vocals, guitar, mellotron, harmonium & organ
 Neill MacColl – vocals, guitar, dulcimer & autoharp
 Martyn Baker – drums & percussion
 Simon Edwards – electric bass & upright bass
 Tobias Froberg – piano
 Jo Montgomery – violin
 Graham Hardy – flugelhorn & trumpet

Recording details 
 Recorded – "in very well creosoted sheds in Cambridgeshire" \ horns & violin in Kathryn’s garage and autoharp in Neill’s basement
 Mixed at  The Dairy Studios
 Artwork by Kathryn Williams
 Produced by Neil MacColl and Kathryn Williams

References

External links 

Kathryn Williams albums
2008 albums